Istros may refer to:

 Istros the Callimachean – Greek author, whose writings survive only in fragments

Geography
 Istros (island), island in the Aegean Sea
 Histria (Sinoe) or Istros, an ancient Greek colony on the western shore of the Black Sea, near the modern village of Istria, Constanța, Romania
 The ancient Greek name for the lower section of the Danube, Europe's second longest river
 In Greek mythology, one of the Potamoi (river gods), descended from the Titans Oceanus and Tethys, associated with the Istros River (modern Danube).

Culture
 Istros Books, a London-based publisher of books from the Balkans in English translation